Heather James (also known as Heather Moray) is a British television actress. She has appeared in a number of television series including Cribb, The Black Tower, One by One, Columbo, and New Tricks.

References

External links
 

British television actresses
Living people
Year of birth missing (living people)
Place of birth missing (living people)